Moacir Pereira (born 1 January 1960 in Nova Lima) is a Brazilian football coach.

Coaching career 
He previously managed South Korean side Daegu FC and CSE, a Brazilian football club based in Palmeira dos Índios, Alagoas state.

References
Moacir Pereira official website

Living people
1960 births
Brazilian football managers
Vila Nova Futebol Clube managers
Daegu FC managers